Kilpatrick is one of the six wards used to elect members of the West Dunbartonshire Council. It elects three Councillors.

The ward covers the northern outskirts of Clydebank, namely the adjoining suburban villages of Duntocher, Faifley and Hardgate.

Councillors

Election Results

2022 Election
2022 West Dunbartonshire Council election

2017 Election
2017 West Dunbartonshire Council election

2012 Election
2012 West Dunbartonshire Council election

2007 Election
2007 West Dunbartonshire Council election

References

Wards of West Dunbartonshire